Symphony Limited is an Indian multinational electronics company, that specializes in manufacturing air coolers. It is based in Ahmedabad and was established in 1988. It is a public limited, listed company, with operations in about 60 countries.

History 
Initially incorporated as Sanskrut Comfort Systems Ltd. (SCS) in 1988 that manufactured consumer durables under brand name ‘Symphony’. Then later in the year 1990, Symphony aired its first TV campaign. Symphony went public in the year 1994 and was also listed at Bombay, Ahmedabad and Delhi stock exchanges.

In 2006, it acquired IMPCO, USA, in the same year. In 2010, Symphony introduced Industrial coolers in Indian market.

Global presence 
Symphony's 25-30 percent of the turnover comes from international market as it covers Mexico, Europe, United States, West Asia and South-East Asia. The year 2008 marked Symphony's foray in the North American market. Symphony acquired the Mexican assets of the International Metal Products Company (IMPCO) which was founded by Adam Goettl, the man who invented air coolers for $650,000. With this collaboration, Achal Bakeri realized that IMPCO's large commercial air coolers could be deployed to India too. 
In the year 2015, Symphony announced acquisition of Chinese air cooler company Munters Keruilai Air Treatment Equipment (Guangdong) Co. Ltd. (MKE) that owns the brand Keruilai, for Rs 1.5 cr. They signed an equity transfer agreement with the shareholders of MKE to acquire 100 per cent of their equity share capital. This marked Symphony's entry into the China market which is the second largest air cooler market in the world after India. 
Further in 2018, Symphony announced its agreement to purchase 95% equity stake in Climate Technologies, an Australian manufacturer of cooling and heating products. The deal was signed as an opportunity to reduce business risks as a result of opposite winter and summer seasons in India and Australia. The acquisition was executed at a valuation range of A$40–44 million (lNR 201 Crs - INR 22I Crs).

In 1994 the company briefly diversified into the household electrical appliances sector in order to counter the seasonal nature of the air cooler business. It later reverted to manufacturing only air coolers. Between 2002 and 2004, Symphony exited all other categories and resumed its focus on air coolers.

Acquisition 
In 2015, Symphony Ltd acquired Munters Keruilai Air Treatment Equipment, a Chinese air cooler company.

In June 2018, Symphony Ltd signed an agreement to purchase 95% equity stake in Climate Technologies Pty Limited ("Climate
Technologies", or "CT"), an Australian manufacturer of cooling and heating appliances. The acquisition was to be executed at a valuation range of AS 40-44 million (INR 201 - 221 crs) depending on the achievement of FY18F EBITDA (June ended).

References

External links 
 

Manufacturing companies based in Ahmedabad
Companies based in Gujarat
Manufacturing companies established in 1988
1988 establishments in Gujarat
Indian companies established in 1988
Companies listed on the National Stock Exchange of India
Companies listed on the Bombay Stock Exchange